New Hampshire's 14th State Senate district is one of 24 districts in the New Hampshire Senate. It has  been represented by Republican Sharon Carson since 2008.

Geography
District 14 covers the towns of Auburn, Hudson, and Londonderry in Hillsborough and Rockingham Counties.

The district is split evenly between New Hampshire's 1st congressional district and New Hampshire's 2nd congressional district. It borders the state of Massachusetts.

Recent election results

2020

2018

2016

2014

2012

Federal and statewide results in District 14

References

14
Hillsborough County, New Hampshire
Rockingham County, New Hampshire